Long Branch is a census-designated place in Fairfax County, Virginia, bordering the city of Fairfax. The population as of the 2010 census was 7,593.

Geography

The CDP lies mainly in the watershed of Long Branch, an Accotink Creek tributary. The CDP is bounded by Guinea Road to the east, Braddock Road to the south, Little River Turnpike (Virginia State Route 236) to the north, the Fairfax city limits to the northwest, and Burke Station Road to the west. Neighboring census-designated places are Mantua to the north, Wakefield to the east, Burke to the south, Kings Park West to the southwest, and George Mason to the west.

W.T. Woodson High School, Frost Middle School, Olde Creek Elementary and Little Run Elementary are located here.

References

Census-designated places in Fairfax County, Virginia
Washington metropolitan area
Census-designated places in Virginia